Hera Hilmarsdóttir (born 27 December 1988), known professionally as Hera Hilmar, is an Icelandic actress. She has been active in the film industry since 1995.

Personal life
Hera is the daughter of the film director Hilmar Oddsson and the actress Thorey Sigthorsdottir (Þórey Sigþórsdóttir). Her grandfather was the playwright and theater director Oddur Björnsson.

She graduated from the London Academy of Music and Dramatic Art in 2011.

Career
Hera was nominated for an Edda as Actress of the Year in a leading role in 2007 for her role in The Quiet Storm. She joined Da Vinci's Demons in 2013 as Vanessa Moschella, outspoken Florentine barmaid and occasional model for Leonardo.

Later she won the same award (Edda) twice, first in 2015 for her role as Eik in Life in a Fishbowl, and then in 2017 for her role as Anna in The Oath. She was also chosen as one of Europe's Shooting Stars at the Berlin International Film Festival in 2015, as well as winning a ‘special mention’ at the Zurich Film Festival for her role in Life in a Fishbowl.

In 2015, Hera explored Turkey to prepare for production of the period drama film The Ottoman Lieutenant, in which she played Lillie Rowe, a 20-year-old nurse from a prominent Philadelphia family. While there, she remarked the landscape around the filming location is breathtaking. Around the same time, Hera played Tanja, a Serbian agent disguised as a housemaid alongside Ben Kingsley in Brad Silberling's film, An Ordinary Man, which was later screened in 2017 before being released direct-to-video in June 2018.

In 2016, Hera starred in The Ashram, which would be released two years later.

In February 2017, less than two months after her 28th birthday, Hera was doing a play in Iceland when she heard about Peter Jackson’s film, Mortal Engines, based on the novel of the same name by Philip Reeve. Writer Philippa Boyens described her audition via Skype was "flawless", and she was cast thereafter. Her character, Hester Shaw, is different than in the novel, as she is aged up a bit, and is made a protagonist. Upon release, she recounted reading the source material and going through the action that the complexly crafted world she tried to understand during filming, which took place between April and July 2017.

In June 2018, Hera was cast in Matt Weiner's anthology series The Romanoffs. On October 18, 2018, it was reported that she joined the Apple TV+ series See, alongside Christian Camargo. She plays Maghra, the wife of Baba Voss, a character played by Jason Momoa. The series has two seasons out already and the third is currently premiering in the fall of 2022 on AppleTv+.

During the pandemic, Hera both spent her time filming season 2 and 3 of SEE for AppleTv+, as well as collaborating with The Icelandic Film Centre for the 2020 short films Last Dance and Óskin, or “The Wish”. She also starred as the leading role “Helga” in Asa Helga Hjorleifsdottir’s feature film adaptation of Svar við bréfi Helgu, or “A Reply to a Letter from Helga”. In addition, she provided a narration for the video revealing the new national Icelandic football team crest.

Filmography

Film

Television

References

External links 
 
 
 

1988 births
Living people
Icelandic film actresses
Icelandic child actresses
Icelandic television actresses
20th-century Icelandic actresses
21st-century Icelandic actresses
Icelandic expatriates in the United Kingdom
Icelandic expatriates in the United States
Actresses from Reykjavík